Syed Jabir Raza (born 1 August 1955) is an Indian historian, and a researcher in the history stream. Presently, he is working as a lecturer at Department of History in Women's College of Aligarh Muslim University. He is from Nalanda, Bihar.

Academic Qualification
S. Jabir Raza has pursued Masters in Arts, and a M.Phil degree. He has also done Ph.D. with a specialization in Medieval India. He has also received the Charles Wallace fellowship from the School of Oriental and African Studies, University of London, in 1996.

Books and research papers published
 The Jats of Punjab and Sind: Their Settlements and Migrations (c. 5th-12th AD)
 The Martial Jats: Their conflict with the Ghaznavid Sultans
 Ghaznavid Origins of the Administrative Institutions of the Delhi Sultanat
 Epigraphic Evidence for Officials and Administrative Offices in the Delhi Sultanate
 Nomenclature and Titulature of the Early Turkish Sultans of Delhi Found in Numismatic Legends
 Iqta'  system in the pre-Ghurid kingdoms and its antecedents
 The Afghans and their relations with the Ghaznavids and the Ghurids
 Sultan Mahmud's Military Route to Kannauj
 S. Jabir Raza has published 20 papers.

Notability
 One of the paper published by S. Jabir Raza was selected by the University Grants Commission (India) for its model curriculum: History and Archaeology, 2002.
 Two of the papers by him has been included in the syllabus of Jamia Hamdard University (New Delhi) and Centre Of Advanced Study in History, Aligarh Muslim University.

References

1955 births
Living people
20th-century Indian historians
Indian male writers
Indian Muslims
Scholars from Bihar
Academic staff of Aligarh Muslim University
Aligarh Muslim University alumni